Lovespring International is an American sitcom created by Guy Shalem and Brad Isaacs which aired on Lifetime on Mondays at 11pm during the Summer of 2006 in the United States. Lovespring was canceled on December 1, 2006. Executive produced by Big Cattle Productions (established by Will & Grace's Eric McCormack and business partner, Michael Forman), the show revolves around six employees at "Lovespring International", a dating agency located in Tarzana, California (even though it sells itself as an "elite Beverly Hills" company). There is at least one guest star per episode, and that guest is the seeker of a "match" in any particular episode.

The main characters, or employees, are manager Lydia Mayhew (played by Wendi McLendon-Covey), Victoria Ratchford (played by Jane Lynch), psychologist Steve Morris (played by Jack Plotnick), receptionist Tiffany Riley Clarke (played by Jennifer Elise Cox), staff videographer Alex Odom (played by Mystro Clark), and matchmakers Burke Kristopher (played by Sam Pancake).

Cast
Wendi McLendon-Covey as Lydia Mayhew
Jack Plotnick as Steve Morris
Jennifer Elise Cox as Tiffany Riley Clarke
Sam Pancake as Burke Kristopher
Mystro Clark as Alex Odom
Jane Lynch as Victoria Ratchford

Episodes

International broadcasters

References

External links
 
 

2000s American single-camera sitcoms
2006 American television series debuts
2006 American television series endings
Lifetime (TV network) original programming
Television series by Lionsgate Television
English-language television shows
Television shows set in California